Owaka is a small town in the Clutha District of South Otago, in the South Island of New Zealand.

Geography
The town lies on a river flat surrounded by hills - it is overlooked by the  Mount Misery, which lies immediately to the town's east.

History

The town's name comes from the Māori for "the place of canoes", a reference to the town's location close to the Ōwaka River, which joins the Catlins River three kilometres (2 miles) from the town, close to the coast. The town was originally called Catlins River, then Quakerfield.

On 22 June 1896, Owaka became the terminus of the Catlins River Branch railway, and it retained this status until an extension of the branch line to Ratanui was opened on 1 August 1904. The railway ultimately terminated in Tahakopa, but as traffic declined on the line in its later years, the Tuesday freight train (one of four per week) ran only as far as Owaka after 1958.

The branch closed on 27 February 1971, and little evidence of its existence remains in or around Owaka besides some of the line's old formation, as the last substantial relic, Owaka station's goods shed, was removed in 1986.

In November 1991, 15-year old Kylie Smith was abducted in Owaka and was raped and murdered by Paul Bailey. Bailey pled guilty in 1992, and was subsequently jailed for life, with a non-parole period of 10 years. In 2021, his application for parole was denied and his next opportunity will be in 2023. Bailey's offending had a substantial impact on the town at the time: the local pastor, who had assisted Bailey in gaining employment in Owaka, had his house vandalised, and a lynch mob threatened to burn down his church, whilst that same mob burned down Bailey's house.

Demographics
Owaka is described by Statistics New Zealand as a rural settlement.

Owaka had a population of 309 at the 2018 New Zealand census, an increase of 3 people (1.0%) since the 2013 census, and a decrease of 18 people (−5.5%) since the 2006 census. There were 141 households. There were 153 males and 156 females, giving a sex ratio of 0.98 males per female, with 51 people (16.5%) aged under 15 years, 42 (13.6%) aged 15 to 29, 150 (48.5%) aged 30 to 64, and 69 (22.3%) aged 65 or older.

Ethnicities were 99.0% European/Pākehā, 14.6% Māori, and 1.0% other ethnicities (totals add to more than 100% since people could identify with multiple ethnicities).

Although some people objected to giving their religion, 66.0% had no religion, 23.3% were Christian and 1.9% had other religions.

Of those at least 15 years old, 21 (8.1%) people had a bachelor or higher degree, and 84 (32.6%) people had no formal qualifications. The employment status of those at least 15 was that 123 (47.7%) people were employed full-time, 39 (15.1%) were part-time, and 9 (3.5%) were unemployed.

Education

The school opened in 1875 as Owaka District High School.

References

Populated places in Otago
Southern Scenic Route
The Catlins
Clutha District